Prestin is a protein that is critical to sensitive hearing in mammals.  It is encoded by the SLC26A5 (solute carrier anion transporter family 26, member 5) gene.

Prestin is the motor protein of the outer hair cells of the inner ear of the mammalian cochlea. It is highly expressed in the outer hair cells, and is not expressed in the nonmotile inner hair cells. Immunolocalization shows prestin is expressed in the lateral plasma membrane of the outer hair cells, the region where electromotility occurs. The expression pattern correlates with the appearance of outer hair cell electromotility.

Function 

Prestin is essential in auditory processing. It is specifically expressed in the lateral membrane of outer hair cells (OHCs) of the cochlea. There is no significant difference between prestin density in high-frequency and low-frequency regions of the cochlea in fully developed mammals. There is good evidence that prestin has undergone adaptive evolution in mammals  associated with acquisition of high frequency hearing in mammals. The prestin protein shows several parallel amino acid replacements in bats, whales, and dolphins that have independently evolved ultrasonic hearing and echolocation, and these represent rare cases of convergent evolution at the sequence level.

Prestin (mol. wt. 80 kDa) is a member of a distinct family of anion transporters, SLC26. Members of this family are structurally well conserved and can mediate the electroneutral exchange of chloride and carbonate across the plasma membrane of mammalian cells, two anions found to be essential for outer hair cell motility. Unlike the classical, enzymatically driven motors, this new type of motor is based on direct voltage-to-displacement conversion and acts several orders of magnitude faster than other cellular motor proteins. A targeted gene disruption strategy of prestin showed a >100-fold (or 40 dB) loss of auditory sensitivity.

Prestin is a transmembrane protein that mechanically contracts and elongates leading to electromotility of outer hair cells (OHC). Electromotility is the driving force behind the somatic motor of the cochlear amplifier, which is a mammalian evolution that increases sensitivity to incoming sound wave frequencies and, thus, amplifies the signal. Previous research has suggested that this modulation takes place via an extrinsic voltage-sensor (partial anion transporter model), whereby chloride binds to the intracellular side of prestin and enters a defunct transporter, causing prestin elongation. However, there is new evidence that prestin acts through an intrinsic voltage-sensor (IVS) in which intracellular chloride binds allosterically to prestin to modify shape.

Intrinsic voltage sensing 

In this model of intrinsic voltage-sensing, the movement of ions generates a nonlinear capacitance (NLC). Based upon the generated voltage and the depolarized or hyperpolarized state of the cell, prestin will transition through two distinct steps, representing the three-state model of prestin modulation. Experiments show that with increasing depolarizing stimuli, prestin transitions from an elongated state to an intermediate state to a contracted state, increasing its NLC. Under hyperpolarizing conditions, NLC decreases and prestin transitions back to its elongated state. Of significance, increased membrane tension as characterized by prestin elongation decreases the chloride allosteric binding site affinity for chloride, perhaps playing a role in regulation of prestin modulation. The total estimated displacement of prestin upon modulation from elongated to contracted state is 3–4 nm2. A recent study supports the IVS model showing that mutations of 12 residues that span the intracellular side of prestin's core membrane resulted in significant decrease in NLC. Eight of the 12 residues were positively charged and are hypothesized to make up the allosteric chloride binding site of prestin.

Anion transport 

Although previously thought to be absent, anion transport has also been shown to be an important aspect of prestin's ability to drive electromotility of hair cells. This mechanism is independent of prestin's voltage-sensing capabilities based upon mutagenesis experiments showing that different mutations lead to effects in either anion-uptake or NLC, but not both. It is suggested that prestin contains an intrinsic anion-uptake mechanism based upon research showing concentration dependent [14C]formate uptake in Chinese hamster ovary (CHO) cells. These results could not be reproduced in oocytes. Therefore, prestin may require an associated cofactor for anion uptake in oocytes; however, this hypothesis is still under question. Experiments have shown that various anions can compete for prestin uptake including malate, chloride, and alkylsulfonic anions.

Discovery 

Prestin was discovered by Peter Dallos's group in 2000 and named from the musical notation presto because of the speed of the protein.

The prestin molecule was patented by its discoverers in 2003.

Clinical significance 

Mutations in the SLC26A5 gene have been associated with non-syndromic hearing loss.

Blockers 

Electromotile function of mammalian prestin is blocked by the amphiphilic anion salicylate at millimolar concentrations. Application of salicylate  blocks prestin function in a dose-dependent and readily reversible manner.

References

Further reading 

 
 
 
 
 
 
 
 
 
 
 
 
 

Solute carrier family